West Akim Municipal District is one of the thirty-three districts in Eastern Region, Ghana. Originally created as an ordinary district assembly in 1988 when it was known as West Akim District, which was created from the former West Akim District Council. Later, it was elevated to municipal district assembly status on 1 November 2007 (effectively 29 February 2008) to become West Akim Municipal District. However on 28 June 2012, the southern part of the district was split off to create Upper West Akim District; thus the remaining part has been retained as West Akim Municipal District. The municipality is located in the southern part of Eastern Region and has Asamankese as its capital town.

List of settlements

Sources
 
 Districts: West Akim Municipal District

References

Districts of the Eastern Region (Ghana)